Muhammad Ali Jalali (died 2006) was Governor of Paktika from the Taliban's fall in 2001 to 2005, when he quit for an unsuccessful run at a parliamentary seat.  In 2006 he was  martyred by Taliban militants while travelling in Ghazni province .  Jalali was replaced by the Governor in 2004 after reports that the Taliban were in effective control of large parts of Paktika, and that he was personally collaborating with them .

Governors of Paktika Province
Pashtun people
Assassinated Afghan politicians
People murdered in Afghanistan

Year of birth missing
2006 deaths